Della Raj, better known by her stage name Raksha Raj is an Indian film and television actress who works in Tamil and Malayalam films and serials.

Filmography

Films

Television

References

Indian actresses
Living people
Year of birth missing (living people)
Actresses in Malayalam cinema
Actresses in Malayalam television
Actresses in Tamil cinema